The 1936 PGA Championship was the 19th PGA Championship, held November 16–22 at Pinehurst Resort in Pinehurst, North Carolina.  Then a match play championship, Denny Shute won the first of his consecutive PGA Championships, defeating Jimmy Thomson 3 & 2 on the No. 2 Course.

It was Shute's second major title; his first was at the British Open in 1933 at St. Andrews. He previously made the finals at the PGA Championship in 1931.

Fay Coleman was the medalist in the stroke play qualifier at 143 (−1). Five-time champion Walter Hagen and two-time winner Leo Diegel both shot 157 (+13), one stroke out of the playoff. Defending champion Johnny Revolta lost in the second round to Harold "Jug" McSpaden in 19 holes.

Shute repeated as champion less than seven months later in May 1937. He was the last to successfully defend his title at the PGA Championship until Tiger Woods won consecutive titles twice, in 1999–2000 and 2006–2007.

This was the first major played at Pinehurst and Course No. 2, which had sand greens until 1935. While the PGA Championship has yet to return, the U.S. Open was held at the course in 1999, 2005, and 2014. It hosted the Ryder Cup in 1951 and the U.S. Women's Open was also here in 2014.

Format
The match play format at the PGA Championship in 1936 called for 12 rounds (216 holes) in seven days:
 Monday and Tuesday – 36-hole stroke play qualifier, 18 holes per day;
defending champion Johnny Revolta and top 63 professionals advanced to match play
 Wednesday – first two rounds, 18 holes each
 Thursday – third round – 36 holes
 Friday – quarterfinals – 36 holes
 Saturday – semifinals – 36 holes
 Sunday – final – 36 holes

Past champions in the field

Failed to qualify

Source:

Final results
Sunday, November 22, 1936

Final eight bracket

Final match scorecards
Morning

Afternoon

Source:

References

External links
PGA Media Guide 2012
PGA.com – 1936 PGA Championship

PGA Championship
Golf in North Carolina
PGA Championship
PGA Championship
PGA Championship
PGA Championship